Iglesia de San Francisco is a church in the Spanish city of Ceuta, bordering northern Morocco. It stands at the side of the Plaza de los Reyes, and is a distinctive Baroque twin-towered yellow building. It was built in the early eighteenth century in honour of the Holy Cross and is noted for its Baroque altarpieces and images of the Virgin and Christ.

References

Churches in Ceuta
Baroque architecture in Spain
Portuguese colonial architecture in Spain